Marios Tzavidas (born 8 October 2003) is a Greek professional footballer who plays as a forward for Super League club Atromitos.

Career

Atromitos
On 5 July 2021, Tzavidas signed a three-year contract with Atromitos. 

In the 2022–23 season's opener, Tzavidas scored his first professional goal, helping to a 3-1 home win against OFI.

Personal life
Tzavidas' brother, Spyros, is a former professional football player.

Career statistics

References

2003 births
Living people
Greece youth international footballers
Super League Greece players
Atromitos F.C. players
Association football forwards
Footballers from Athens
Greek footballers